The 2004 Villanova Wildcats football team represented Villanova University in the 2004 NCAA Division I-AA football season as a member of the Atlantic 10 Conference (A-10). The Wildcats were led by 20th-year head coach Andy Talley and played their home games at Villanova Stadium. They finished the season with an overall record of six wins and five losses (6–5, 3–5 in the A-10).

Schedule

References

Villanova
Villanova Wildcats football seasons
Villanova Wildcats football